José Carlos Garcia Leal or simply Zé Carlos (born 15 July 1980 in Manga, Minas Gerais), is a Brazilian football coach and former player who played as either a left back or a midfielder. He is the current assistant manager of Confiança.

Club statistics

Honours
Goiás State League: 1999, 2000, 2002
Brazilian League (2nd division): 1999
Brazilian Center-West Cup: 2000, 2001, 2002

References

External links

 globoesporte 
 José Carlos Garcia Leal at BDFA.com.ar 
 

1980 births
Living people
Brazilian footballers
Brazilian football managers
Brazilian expatriate footballers
Expatriate footballers in Japan
Campeonato Brasileiro Série A players
J1 League players
J2 League players
Campeonato Brasileiro Série D managers
Goiás Esporte Clube players
Associação Desportiva São Caetano players
Sport Club Corinthians Paulista players
Cerezo Osaka players
Botafogo de Futebol e Regatas players
Clube Náutico Capibaribe players
Sociedade Esportiva e Recreativa Caxias do Sul players
Grêmio Barueri Futebol players
Associação Atlética Aparecidense players
Sobradinho Esporte Clube players
Associação Desportiva Recreativa e Cultural Icasa players
Ituano FC players
Associação Atlética Aparecidense managers
Association football defenders 
Association football midfielders
Campeonato Brasileiro Série B managers
Associação Desportiva Confiança managers